Terina was an ancient city of Magna Graecia on the north shore of the Gulf of Saint Euphemia, about  from Lamezia Terme in Calabria. The site of the city was allegedly found in 1922 by the archaeologist Paolo Orsi near the modern village of Sant'Eufemia Vetere, but a systematic archaeological investigation was only started in 1997  and it is only based on coins found there. Coins, inscriptions and other artefacts retrieved from the site can be seen in the Museo Archeologico Lametino in Lamezia Terme.The actual collocation of the ancient city is in Sant'Eufemia Vetere where the original location is situated on top of a hill called Piano di Tirena. This hill is surrounded by two rivers merging, Savuto and Grande, and it perfectly matches the description provided by the Greek historian Strabo in his major work Geographica, which was first published around 20 AD.

History
In the fifth century BC the Greek cities Croton and Locri, both located on the Ionian Sea, vied for the control of ports on the Tyrrhenian Sea. These ports were important for conducting trade. Locri had founded the cities Medma and Hipponium there and had assumed control of Metauros. Temesa lay north of Hipponium and had close relations with Croton, which may have been its mother city. Temesa was valuable because of its copper mines and its trade with the north. Locri conquered Temesa at some time in the first half of the fifth century BC, probably in the 480s or 470s. Croton was disadvantaged by the loss and founded Terina at this time to compensate. Terina's foundation is dated to 480–470 BC. It started minting its own coins sometime after 480 BC, which indicates that it soon became independent from its mother city.

Terina became a prosperous city and protected the route from the Tyrrhenian Sea to Croton. Later in the second half of the fifth century BC Terina was attacked by Thurii, after that city's foundation in 444/3 BC. Thurii wanted to capture Terina because the city was closely connected with Croton, Thurii's enemy. The Spartan general Cleandridas who led the Thurian army planned a surprise attack, but this failed when his army was discovered. He retreated after ravaging the city's countryside.

When the Bruttians arose as a new ethnic group in Lucania in 356/5 BC their first target was Terina, which they besieged and plundered. When Alexander of Epirus arrived in Southern Italy in approximately 333 BC he took the city from the Bruttians. He did not possess it for long because he was defeated by a combined army of Bruttians and Lucanians at the Battle of Pandosia in 331 BC. At some later point Terina became a Roman possession. It was ultimately destroyed in the Second Punic War by Hannibal because he could not defend the city during his stay in Bruttium.

The city was rebuilt at some point because it is mentioned again by Pliny the Elder.

Material evidence of the presence of an ancient settlement in the area of Sant'Eufemia dates back to 1865, when a gold diadem and a treasure of jewels of the 4th century BC were found by chance.  At the end of the same century, it was sold to the British Museum of London, where it is still preserved today.

Terina is linked to the myth of Ligea, one of the three Sirens of Homer's Odyssey.

References

Sources

Primary sources

Secondary sources

Further reading

External links 
 Description of Terina's archaeological site by the comune of Lamezia Terme 
 Website of the Museo Archeologico Lametino 
 Coins of Terina

Achaean colonies of Magna Graecia
Former populated places in Italy
Archaeological sites in Calabria